Jalubí is a municipality and village in Uherské Hradiště District in the Zlín Region of the Czech Republic. It has about 1,800 inhabitants.

References

Villages in Uherské Hradiště District